The Sears–Haack body is the shape with the lowest theoretical wave drag in supersonic flow, for a given body length and given volume.  The mathematical derivation assumes small-disturbance (linearized) supersonic flow, which is governed by the Prandtl–Glauert equation.  The derivation and shape were published independently by two separate researchers: Wolfgang Haack in 1941 and later by William Sears in 1947.

The theory indicates that the wave drag scales as the square of the second derivative of the area distribution,  (see full expression below), so for low wave drag it is necessary that  be smooth.  Thus, the Sears–Haack body is pointed at each end and grows smoothly to a maximum and then decreases smoothly toward the second point.

Useful formulas
The cross-sectional area of a Sears–Haack body is

its volume is

its radius is

the derivative (slope) is

the second derivative is

where:
 x is the ratio of the distance from the nose to the whole body length (this is always between 0 and 1),
 r is the local radius,
  is the radius at its maximum (occurs at x = 0.5, center of the shape),
 V is the volume,
 L is the length.

From Slender-body theory, it follows that:

alternatively:

These formulae may be combined to get the following:

where:
  is the wave drag force,
  is the drag coefficient (normaled by the dynamic pressure and frontal area),
  is the density of the fluid,
 U is the velocity.

Generalization by R. T. Jones
The Sears–Haack body shape derivation is correct only in the limit of a slender body.
The theory has been generalized to slender but non-axisymmetric shapes by Robert T. Jones in NACA Report 1284. In this extension, the area  is defined on the Mach cone whose apex is at location , rather than on the  plane as assumed by Sears and Haack.  Hence, Jones's theory makes it applicable to more complex shapes like entire supersonic aircraft.

Area rule
A superficially related concept is the Whitcomb area rule, which states that wave drag due to volume in transonic flow depends primarily on the distribution of total cross-sectional area, and for low wave drag this distribution must be smooth.  A common misconception is that the Sears–Haack body has the ideal area distribution according to the area rule, but this is not correct.  The Prandtl–Glauert equation, which is the starting point in the Sears–Haack body shape derivation, is not valid in transonic flow, which is where the area rule applies.

See also
 Prandtl–Glauert transformation
 Aerodynamics
 Anti-shock body
 Haack series nose cone
 Area rule

References

External links
 Haack Minimum Drag Rifle Bullet Site down – https://web.archive.org/web/20160306044740/http://www.lima-wiederladetechnik.de/englisch/haack_minimum_drag_bullet.htm
 Geschoßformen kleinsten Wellenwiderstandes by W. Haack, Bericht 139 der Lilienthal-Gesellschaft (1941)
 Sears–Haack body calculator

Aerodynamics